The V.Flash Home Edutainment System, also known as V.Smile Pro in Europe, is a seventh-generation educational home video game console and spinoff from the V.Smile series of video game consoles manufactured and released by VTech. Unlike the V.Smile, this game console uses 3D graphics. This system is designed for kids aged 6 to 10.

History
It was revealed at the 2006 London Toy Fair, and released in September 2006. The system retailed for $100.

Games
Since the console did not sell as well as the V.Smile, not many games were made for it. All games were released in the United States, the United Kingdom, Spain, France and Germany, with the exceptions of Bratz Fashion Pixiez: The Secret Necklace, which was not released in the United Kingdom and Germany, Multisports, which was exclusive to Germany, and Scooby-Doo!: Ancient Adventure, which was not released in Germany. Additionally, Bratz Fashion Pixiez: The Secret Necklace, Cars: In the Fast Lane and Disney Princess: The Crystal Ball Adventure were released in Mexico.

There are 10 titles known to have been released. The Princeton Review was involved in the development of educational content for some games.

CDs
Unlike most other CD-ROM-based consoles, this system uses 12 cm CDs enclosed with plastic to protect damage from touching (although it could also protect from piracy), which is somewhat similar to 3.5" floppy disks or UMDs. The discs use the ISO 9660 file system, without any copy protection mechanism other than a simple sensor in the case jacket, making it possible to make a disc image out of the media. Because of this, the V.Flash can also play audio CDs and user-recorded CD-Rs using the supplied disc adapter.

Other hardware
The processor is an ARM9 processor from LSI Logic. Files are stored in 3 main formats: .mjp (Motion JPEG), .ptx (Pro Tools session file), and .snd. The latter have been determined to be PCM WAV files.

Capable of rendering 1.5 million polygons per second and equipped with a 32 bit CPU, this system is directly comparable to the fifth generation game consoles, such as the PlayStation.

The system may use a memory card to save games.

See also
 VTech
 V.Smile
 VTech Socrates

Notes

References

External links
 Official Site
 ARM Processor
 Vtech V.Flash Educational Line
 http://dso.com/news/showArticle.jhtml?articleID=177100739
 V.Flash reverse engineering
 VFlash technical details and reverse-engineering
 V.Smile Shop archived in the Wayback Machine on December 27, 2013
 20th Century Retro Games entry (Gallery page for various VTech V.Smile models, including V.Flash)

VTech
Seventh-generation video game consoles
ARM-based video game consoles
CD-ROM-based consoles